In the men's 10 metre platform event at the 2015 European Diving Championships, the gold medal was won by Martin Wolfram from Germany.

Medalists

Results

Green denotes finalists

References

2015 European Diving Championships